Vayk Municipality, referred to as Vayk Community ( Vayk Hamaynk), is an urban community and administrative subdivision of Vayots Dzor Province of Armenia, at the southeastern end of the country. Consisted of a group of settlements, its administrative centre is the town of Vayk.

Included settlements

See also
Vayots Dzor Province

References

Communities in Vayots Dzor Province
2016 establishments in Armenia